Pleurosternidae is an extinct family of freshwater turtles belonging to Paracryptodira. They are definitively known from the Late Jurassic to Early Cretaceous (Albian) of Western Europe and North America.

Genera

Valid taxa 
Dinochelys  Morrison Formation, United States, Late Jurassic (Tithonian)
Dorsetochelys Purbeck Group, England, Early Cretaceous (Berriasian)  Bückeberg Formation, Germany, Berriasian
Glyptops  Morrison Formation, United States, Late Jurassic (Tithonian)
Pleurosternon Purbeck Group, England, Early Cretaceous (Berriasian), Ágreda locality, Spain, Tithonian-Berriasian, France, Tithonian-Berriasian
Riodevemys Villar del Arzobispo Formation, Spain, Late Jurassic (Tithonian)
Selenemys Lourinhã Formation, Portugal, Late Jurassic (Kimmeridgian)
Toremys Escucha Formation, Spain, Early Cretaceous (Albian)
Uluops from the Late Jurassic of North America may also belong to Pleurosternidae.

Invalid taxa 

 Desmemys Bückeberg Formation, Germany, Berriasian (nomen dubium)

Ecology 
The high morphological diversity of skulls of the group suggests high ecological plasticity. Glyptops and Pleurosternon exhibit adaptions likely for suction feeding, while Dorsteochelys was likely a dietary generalist.

References

 
Prehistoric reptile families
Late Jurassic turtles
Taxa named by Edward Drinker Cope